Alfred de Breanski (1852 – 1928) was a  noted British painter. His Constablesque, landscapes of England, Scotland and Wales are particularly noted.  Some of his works were exhibited at the Royal Academy  and the Southampton City Art Gallery, The Royal Agricultural University Collection and Brighton and Hove Museums and Art Galleries have holdings of his work.  He had brother, Gustave de Breanski and a son Alfred de Breanski Jnr. who were also painters.

References

External links
Artwork by Alfred De Breanski

English landscape painters
1852 births
1928 deaths